The 1963–64 season was Fussball Club Basel 1893's 70th season in their existence. It was their 18th consecutive season in the top flight of Swiss football after their promotion in the 1945–46 season. They played their home games either in their old Landhof Stadium or in their new St. Jakob Stadium. Lucien Schmidlin was club chairman for the second year running.

Overview

Pre-season
Jiří Sobotka continued his job as club manager, it was his third consecutive year as manager. Basel played a total of 55 games this season. Of these 26 were in the domestic league, three were in the Swiss Cup, two in the 1963–64 European Cup Winners' Cup, three in the Cup of the Alps and 21 were friendly matches. Of these 21 test games 12 were won, five drawn and four were lost. Roberto Frigerio scored 19 goals in 15 test games. Four alone in the game against FC Laufen and a hat-trick against Lugano. 

However, the results of these test games are secondary. The pre-seasons tests were mainly played with lower level, locals teams as release games for the transfers of young players, Marcel Kunz from FC Gerlafingen, Walter Baumann from FC Pratteln and Walter Löffel from FC Moutier.

World tour
A well-documented curiosity was the fact that during the winter break of the 1963–64 season the team travelled on a world tour. This saw them visit British Hong Kong, Malaysia, Singapore, Australia, New Zealand, French Polynesia, Mexico and the United States. First team manager Jiří Sobotka together with 16 players and 15 members of staff, supporters and journalists participated in this world tour from 10 January to 10 February 1964. Team captain Bruno Michaud filmed the events with his super-8 camara. The voyage around the world included 19 flights and numerous bus and train journeys. Club chairman, Lucien Schmidlin, led the group, but as they arrived in the hotel in Bangkok, he realised that 250,000 Swiss Francs were missing. The suitcase that he had filled with the various currencies was not with them. He had left it at home, but fortunately Swiss Air were able to deliver this to him within just a few days. During the tour a total of ten friendly/test games were played, these are listed below. Five wins, three draws, two defeats, but also three major injuries resulted from these test matches. A broken leg for Peter Füri, an eye injury for Walter Baumann and a knee injury for Bruno Michaud soon reduced the number of players to just 13.

Domestic league
There were fourteen teams contesting in the 1963–64 Nationalliga A, these were the top 12 teams from the previous season 1962–63 and the two newly promoted teams Schaffhausen and Cantonal Neuchatel. The Championship was played in a double round-robin, the champions were to be qualified for 1964–65 European Cup and the bottom placed two teams in the table were to be relegated. Basel started well into the season, winning four of the first five matches. Despite three away defeats, up until the winter break the team were championship leaders with seven wins and three draws. The second half of the season, following the world tour, started with three straight defeats. Basel consequently slipped down in the league table and finished the championship in seventh position, with ten wins and six draws from 26 matches, scoring 42 goals conceding 48, with twenty six points, 13 points less than the new champions La Chaux-de-Fonds. Karl Odermatt was the team's top goal scorer in the domestic league with 9 goals.

Swiss Cup
As title holders in the Swiss Cup, Basel started in the 3rd principal round, on 5 October 1963, with an easy away win against SC Schöftland in their attempt to defend this title. In the round of 32 they played away from home against local rivals Concordia which was also won with ease. In the round of 16 Basel were drawn against lower classed Porrentruy. However, this was indeed the best period in the Porrentruy club history. Their player-manager at that time was Basel's former striker Hügi (II) and game ended with a surprising 0–1 defeat, goal scorer in the 56 minute was another former Basel player René Jaeck. Basel's cup campaign came to an abrupt and disappointing end. But Porrentruy, with a quarter-final win over Sion, even advanced as far as the semi-finals. Here they were beaten by the new cup winners Lausanne-Sport.

European Cup Winners' Cup
As Swiss Cup holders Basel were qualified for the 1963–64 European Cup Winners' Cup competition. Here they were drawn against the Scottish cup holders Celtic. Both games ended very disappointingly (1–5 and 0–5) and thus ended with a disastrous aggregate result.

Cup of the Alps
In the Cup of the Alps competition during the group stage Basel played against Genoa C.F.C., Atalanta and Zürich. All three games were played in the Landhof, but all three ended in a defeat and the campaign ended.

Players 

 
 
 

 
 

 
 
 
 
 

 

 
 

 
 
 
 

 

Players who left the squad

Results 

Legend

Friendly matches

Pre-season

Winter break and mid-season

Nationalliga A

League matches

League standings

Swiss Cup

European Cup Winners' Cup

Celtic won 10 – 1 on aggregate.

Cup of the Alps

Group stage

Group 1 table

See also
 History of FC Basel
 List of FC Basel players
 List of FC Basel seasons

References

Sources 
 Rotblau: Jahrbuch Saison 2014/2015. Publisher: FC Basel Marketing AG. 
 Die ersten 125 Jahre. Publisher: Josef Zindel im Friedrich Reinhardt Verlag, Basel. 
 FCB team 1963–64 at fcb-archiv.ch
 Switzerland 1963–64 at RSSSF

External links
 FC Basel official site

FC Basel seasons
Basel